Calliostoma gendalli is a species of sea snail, a marine gastropod mollusk in the family Calliostomatidae.

Some authors place this taxon in the subgenus Calliostoma (Benthastelena).

Description

Distribution
This marine species occurs off the Kermadec Islands, New Zealand

References

 Marshall B. A. (1979). The Trochidae and Turbinidae of the Kermadec Ridge (Mollusca: Gastropoda). New Zealand Journal of Zoology 6: 521–552-page(s): 538

External links

gendalli
Gastropods described in 1979